Anzai (written: 安西, 安斎 or 安済) is a Japanese surname. Notable people with the surname include:

, Japanese novelist
, Japanese voice actress
Earl I. Anzai (born 1941), American lawyer and politician
Emma Anzai, Australian musician
, Japanese actress, model and gravure idol
, Japanese poet
, Japanese idol
, Japanese Go player
, Japanese manga artist
, Japanese photographer
, Japanese footballer
Yukari Anzai (安齋 由香里, birth year unknown), Japanese-Taiwanese voice actor 

, Japanese author

Japanese-language surnames